This is a list of cricket grounds in the Netherlands.  The grounds included in this list have held first-class and List-A matches.  Additionally, some of the List-A matches have come in the form of One Day Internationals.  Some grounds have hosted Women's One Day Internationals and Women's Twenty20 Internationals.

List of grounds

† = Defunct venue for internationals.

References

External links
Cricket grounds in the Netherlands at CricketArchive.

Netherlands
Cricket grounds